"I Can Make You Feel Good" is a 1982 song by American R&B group Shalamar from their Platinum album Friends. It reached  7 in the United Kingdom, making it their first top ten hit, followed by the singles "A Night to Remember" and "There It Is", which both peaked at No. 5.

In 1996, English singer Kavana covered the song; his version reached No. 8 on the UK Singles Chart.

Charts

Shalamar version

Kavana version

References

External links
 Page On Discogs

1982 songs
1982 singles
Shalamar songs
SOLAR Records singles
Song recordings produced by Absolute (production team)
Virgin Records singles